Thitinart Na Pattalung, also stylized as DDnard (born March 23, 1969) is a self-help guru, healer, entrepreneur and bestselling author of the Life Compass series of books.

To date, over 1.5million copies of her books, written under the name "DDnard", have been sold worldwide.

Thitinart is based in Bangpakong, Thailand.

Early life and education 
Thitinart graduated from the University of London at the age of 20 with two master's degrees in Economics and Business Administration. Following graduation, at the age of 25, she launched her own diamond retail business - opening nine stores in Thailand within one month.

Personal hardship and new beginnings 
In 1997, her husband died at the age of 34 of an accident, leaving Thitinart with an 11-month-old son to care for and a debt inheritance of 3 Million US Dollars. It was at this point that she began exploring Buddhist meditation to help provide insight and inner contentment. Within two years, she had managed to pay off the debt.

Thitinart retired from the diamond business at the age of 35, and relocated from Bangkok to live a “peaceful life” with her son in Hua Hin and then Sriracha. She spent time volunteering and teaching meditation and spiritual to various organizations, studied Happiness Sciences, Hypnotherapy, NLP, Behavioral Science, and began work on the first title in what would become the Life Compass books series.

The Life Compass and teachings 
Her first book, entitled “The Life Compass”, was published in Thailand in December 2004. Since then, several more books in the Life Compass series have been released. In 2013, the first English language-edition of The Compass of Now was released, published through The Life Compass Ltd. To date, Thitinart's books have sold more than 1.5million copies worldwide.

Her teachings, which blend traditional Buddhist thought with modern mind technique, provide guidance to students and readers on learning how to clear and focus the mind, deal with emotional and anger issues, work through fears and challenges, and find emotional and financial freedom. In 2013, Thitinart demonstrated some of these techniques during an interview with Thai TV presenter Woody Milintachinda on his chat show 'Woody Kerd Ma Kui'.

Thitinart is the founder of Life Compass Ltd, which hosts regular meditation retreats throughout the year in Thailand. She also gives speeches at prisons, hospitals, military bases, police forces, temples, schools, universities and government organizations throughout Thailand, and talks at venues worldwide.

In 2013, Thitinart was selected as one of the '100 Greatest Thinkers of Thailand' by Thai magazine "A Day Bulletin". Her story is featured in "100 Interview The Thinker" Hard Copy Book.

Publications 
Life Compass series
 The Life Compass (December 2004) 
 The Life Compass 2: Rules of Compass (December 2008) 
 The Life Compass 3: Rules of Happiness (December 2009) 
 The Life Compass 4: Compass NLP (July 2011) 
 The Life Compass 5: Compass of Wealth (October 2012) 
 10th Anniversary Compass Series Box Set (March 2014)
 The Compass of Now (March 2013) 
 The Life Compass 6: Compass of Happiness (January 2014)
 The Life Compass 7: Compass of Freedom (January 2014)

References

1969 births
Living people
Alumni of the University of London
Thitinart Na Pattalung
Thitinart Na Pattalung
Folk healers
Thitinart Na Pattalung
Thitinart Na Pattalung
Thitinart Na Pattalung
Thitinart Na Pattalung
Thitinart Na Pattalung
Thitinart Na Pattalung
Thitinart Na Pattalung